Philipp Seidl (born 20 December 1997) is an Austrian professional footballer who plays as a right-back for Grazer AK.

Club career
He made his Austrian Football First League debut for SC Wiener Neustadt on 8 August 2017 in a game against TSV Hartberg.

On 19 June 2021 he signed with Grazer AK.

References

External links
 

1997 births
People from Gleisdorf
Footballers from Styria
Living people
Austrian footballers
Austria youth international footballers
Austria under-21 international footballers
Association football defenders
SC Wiener Neustadt players
SV Lafnitz players
Kapfenberger SV players
Grazer AK players
2. Liga (Austria) players
Austrian Regionalliga players